Qeshlaq Aghdash-e Hasan Hazi Owghli (also Romanized as Qeshlāq-e Āghdāsh-e Ḩasan Ḩaz̤ī Owghlī) is a village in Qeshlaq-e Sharqi Rural District, Qeshlaq Dasht District, Bileh Savar County, Ardabil Province, Iran. At the 2006 census, its population was 22, in 4 families.

References 

Towns and villages in Bileh Savar County